Notopala hanleyi is a species of large freshwater snail, an aquatic gastropod mollusk in the family Viviparidae. It is also classified as a subspecies Notopala sublineata hanleyi.

This species is endemic to Australia and is found across the Murray-Darling basin.

This species was thought to be extinct, but one population has been found in pipeline in 1993.

It feeds on microbial and organic matter.

References

External links
 River Snail (Notopala sublineata).
 Sanger A. "RECOMMENDATION NOTOPALA SUBLINEATA – (RIVER SNAIL)". Ref. No. FR14, File No. FSC 00/10. (file changed 6 February 2008).

Viviparidae
Gastropods of Australia
Freshwater molluscs of Oceania
Taxa named by Georg Ritter von Frauenfeld